Alan Henrique Ferreira Bastos Soares (born 19 June 1991) is a Brazilian professional footballer who plays as a defender.

Career statistics

Club

References

1991 births
Living people
Brazilian footballers
Association football defenders
Esporte Clube Vitória players
Boa Esporte Clube players
Duque de Caxias Futebol Clube players
S.C. Beira-Mar players
C.D. Nacional players
Umm Salal SC players
FC Inter Turku players
Sriwijaya F.C. players
Varzim S.C. players
KF Bylis Ballsh players
IFK Mariehamn players
FC Lahti players
Brazilian expatriate footballers
Expatriate footballers in Portugal
Brazilian expatriate sportspeople in Portugal
Expatriate footballers in Finland
Brazilian expatriate sportspeople in Finland
Expatriate footballers in Qatar
Brazilian expatriate sportspeople in Qatar
Expatriate footballers in Indonesia
Brazilian expatriate sportspeople in Indonesia
Expatriate footballers in Albania
Brazilian expatriate sportspeople in Albania
Campeonato Brasileiro Série B players
Campeonato Brasileiro Série C players
Liga Portugal 2 players
Primeira Liga players
Veikkausliiga players
Liga 1 (Indonesia) players
Kategoria Superiore players
Footballers from Belo Horizonte